The Battle of Gaza, also referred to as Hamas's takeover of Gaza, was a military conflict between Fatah and Hamas, that took place in the Gaza Strip between June 10 and 15, 2007. It was a prominent event in the Fatah–Hamas conflict, centered on the struggle for power, after Fatah lost the parliamentary elections of 2006. Hamas fighters took control of the Gaza Strip and removed Fatah officials. The battle resulted in the dissolution of the unity government and the de facto division of the Palestinian territories into two entities, the West Bank governed by the Palestinian National Authority, and Gaza governed by Hamas.

The ICRC estimated that at least 118 people were killed and more than 550 were wounded during the fighting in the week up to 15 June.

Background

Palestinian Constitutional Contribution
In 2003, the Basic Law of the Palestinian Authority (PA) was amended and a semi-presidential form of government was established, whereby a constitution creates a directly elected fixed-term president, plus a prime minister and cabinet collectively responsible to the legislature. While some writers do point to the potential advantages of semi-presidentialism, the academic consensus is largely unsupportive of this form of government. 
... in January 2006, Hamas gained a majority at the legislative elections. This led to 'cohabitation' between a Fatah president and a Hamas prime minister and government and created 'two competing centers of power', which is said to be so damaging for fragile democracies with semi-presidential constitutions. Following the election, and in the context of an extremely difficult domestic and international situation, the Palestinian Authority (PA) descended into civil war. By June 2007, the PA had, in effect, split in two, with Hamas ruling the Gaza Strip and Fatah retaining authority over the West Bank. In the same month President Abbas declared a state of emergency and dismissed the Hamas prime minister, Ismail Haniya, though Hamas maintains that this decision was unconstitutional and still considers Haniya to be the legitimate head of government. Whatever the legality of the situation, by this time the governance structures of the Basic Law had all but broken down.

It is very difficult to determine to what extent semi-presidentialism is responsible for the problems of governance in the PA in the period 2006–2007. Indeed, usually, the importance of institutions in shaping the behaviour of political actors in the Palestinian context is often neglected in favour of other factors, notably the inherently conflictual nature of the relationship between Fatah and Hamas. Moreover, the internal and external problems faced by the PA are greater than those faced by almost any other jurisdiction in the world and it would be naive to suggest that semi-presidentialism per se was anything other than a contributory factor to the problems faced by the Authority since January 2006.

The Palestinian Basic Law (2003) is by definition pertinent to the evaluation of the legality of actions of Palestinian parties in the aftermath of the 2006 Palestinian Legislature elections. President Abbas had very specific authorities under the Basic Law. Article 88 – If the president of the state or the prime minister, in case of necessity, suggest the dissolution of the Representative Council to the Council of Ministers, then its dissolution may be approved by a majority of two-thirds of its members. Under article 126 the President is the supreme head of the Palestinian national security forces which had to be headed by a 'cognizant minister' (appointed by the Prime Minister – article 137). Article 137 dictates that the Prime Minister forms the government of Palestine and speaks for it, is head of the Representative Council, and that he appoints ministers and senior positions. Article 153 forbids the formation of armed groups outside the network of national security forces. The police (article 154), on the other hand, form a civilian organisation, part of the Ministry of the Interior (appointed by the Prime Minister). The victors, Hamas, ruled this governing body in 2006/2007 via the Representative Council. Hamas's Ismail Haniyeh, was the prime minister.

The New 2005 Palestinian Authority 
Yasser Arafat, the President of the Palestinian Authority, died on 11 November 2004. The Palestinian presidential election to fill the position took place on 9 January 2005 in both the West Bank and Gaza, but were boycotted by both Hamas and Islamic Jihad. The election resulted in Palestine Liberation Organization (PLO) and Fatah chairman Mahmoud Abbas being elected President to a four-year term. On 8 February 2005 the Palestinian Authority President Mahmoud Abbas and Israeli Prime Minister Ariel Sharon announced a cease-fire. On 17 March 2005 Hamas endorsed the ceasefire. On 19 March 2005 twelve Palestinian factions, including Fatah, Hamas, Islamic Jihad, Popular Front for the Liberation of Palestine (PFLP) and Democratic Front for the Liberation of Palestine (DFLP) signed the Palestinian Cairo Declaration, which reaffirmed the status of the PLO as the sole legitimate representative of the Palestinian people through the participation in it of all forces and factions according to democratic principles. The Declaration implied a reform of the PLO by the inclusion in the PLO of Hamas and Islamic Jihad. On 12 September 2005 Israel completed its disengagement from the Gaza strip.

2006 Palestinian legislative election and aftermath 
The Addameer organisation recorded that, on 26 September 2005, during the lead-up to the 2006 elections, Israel launched a campaign of arrest against Palestinian Legislative Council (PLC) members. Four hundred and fifty members of Hamas were detained, mostly involved in the 2006 PLC elections. On 25 January 2006 the Palestinian legislative election, judged to be free and fair by international observers, took place. It resulted in a Hamas victory, which surprised Israel and the United States which had expected their favoured partner, Fatah, to retain power. On 27 January US President George Bush said "the landslide victory of the militant Islamic group Hamas was rejection of the "status quo" and a repudiation of the "old guard" that had failed to provide honest government and services". On 30 January 2006, the Quartet (United States, Russia, United Nations, and European Union) predicated future foreign assistance to the Palestinian Authority on the future government's commitment to non-violence, recognition of the State of Israel, and acceptance of previous agreements. Hamas rejected these conditions, saying that "the "unfair conditions would endanger the well-being of Palestinians". This view was echoed by Prince Saud of Saudi Arabia who believed that the international community are being "unreasonable". Saudi Foreign Minister Prince Saud al-Faisal told reporters in Malaysia: "The European Union insisted on having elections in Palestine, and this is the result of what they asked for. Now to come around, and say [they] don't accept the will of the people that was expressed through democratic means, seems an unreasonable position to take." The BBC's diplomatic correspondent, James Robbins, said the Quartet's response was chosen with care: "They did not demand a renunciation of violence or immediate recognition of Israel, but a commitment to these things in the future".

Shortly after Hamas established the new Palestinian government on 29 March 2006, which was led by Hamas leader Ismail Haniyeh as Prime Minister and comprised mostly Hamas members, after Fatah and other factions refused to join in a national unity government. The Quartet suspended its foreign assistance program, and Israel imposed economic sanctions and a blockade of the Gaza Strip.

Following the abduction by Hamas militants of Gilad Shalit on 25 June 2006 in a cross-border raid via a tunnel out of Gaza, Israel arrested 49 senior Hamas officials, including 33 parliamentarians, nearly a quarter of PLC members and ministers on the West Bank, and intensified the boycott of Gaza and took other punitive measures.

Interventions in the election outcome 
Mahmoud Abbas was under pressure by the Quartet on the Middle East, which considered Hamas's unacceptable as it was perceived to undermine decades of international efforts to secure a peaceful resolution to the conflict. Therefore, the international community decided to boycott the Hamas-led government by severing diplomatic ties and halting financial aid until Hamas would fulfill certain conditions. It was suggested that Abbas could use his constitutional powers to dismiss the government and call for new elections, which were intended to yield a different result and reinstall Fatah in power on the grounds that the Palestinian electorate would perceive Hamas as a failure. The threat of new elections was never carried out because it emerged that Hamas might in fact be returned to power despite its inability to implement its manifesto and because the movement itself strongly signalled that calling new elections although a constitutional prerogative of the President, would amount to 'a coup against Palestinian legitimacy and the will of the Palestinian people'.

The US and Israel attempted to undermine Hamas and force it from power while strengthening the position of President Abbas.

The new government clashed with President Abbas, who shared power with it based on the Basic Law. Through presidential decrees, Abbas took exclusive presidential authority over several administrative powers and periodically made threats of dismissal.

After refusing to accept the plan of the Hamas-led PA government to reform the security sector loyal to Abbas and Fatah, Abbas placed the security forces under his direct control and built up his own Presidential Guard. Hamas then created a parallel security force, which was made up of its own members of the al-Qassam Brigades. The two forces refused to cooperate. Hamas's forces represented a tradition of armed resistance, whereas those of Fatah's were committed to the upholding of the Oslo Accords.

Preceding confrontations 
By 2007, Hamas was unable to pay salaries or get recognition from European donor countries and international organisations. This led to the first fighting between Hamas and Fatah. In the last month of 2006, factional fighting left 33 people dead. On 7 January 2007, Palestinian Authority President Mahmoud Abbas ordered the Hamas-led Interior Ministry's paramilitary police force, the most powerful armed unit outside his control in the factional fighting, to be incorporated into the security apparatus loyal to him. The ministry responded with defiance, announcing plans to double the size of its force. The combative announcements raised the prospect of an intensified armed standoff. Abbas's only means of enforcing the order appeared to be coercive action by police and security units under his command, but they were relatively weak in the Gaza Strip, Hamas's stronghold.

External involvement 
Documents published in Palestine Papers reveal the British intelligence MI6, helped draw up a security plan for Fatah-led Palestinian Authority. The plan mentioned as objective "encourage and enable the Palestinian Authority (PA) to fully meet its security obligations under Phase 1 of the Roadmap". It proposes a number of ways of "degrading the capabilities of rejectionists", naming Hamas (the victorious party in the recently elected PA executive government), PIJ (Palestinian Islamic Jihad) and the Fatah-linked al-Aqsa Brigades. The plan was described by the Guardian as a "wide-ranging crackdown on Hamas".

In 2004, the plan was passed to Jibril Rajoub, a senior Fatah official of the PA. The bulk of the plan has since been carried out. Issues noted in the plan were suicide bombing, weapons smuggling, Qassam rockets and "terror finance". Its most controversial section recommended that "Degrading the capabilities of the rejectionists—Hamas, PIJ [Palestinian Islamic Jihad] and the [Fatah-linked] Al Aqsa Brigades—through the disruption of their leaderships' communications and command and control capabilities; the detention of key middle-ranking officers; and the confiscation of their arsenals and financial resources". Suggesting temporary internment of leaders and activists, the closure of radio stations and the replacement of imams in mosques.

After 2006 elections, Hamas announced the formation of its own security service, the Executive Force, appointing Jamal Abu Samhadana, a prominent militant, at its head. Abbas had denounced the move as unconstitutional, saying that only the Palestinian president could command armed forces. US training program began after that. According to Lt. Gen. Keith Dayton, the US security coordinator "We are involved in building up the Presidential Guard, instructing it, assisting it to build itself up and giving them ideas. We are not training the forces to confront Hamas," adding that "Hamas is receiving money and arms from Iran and possibly Syria, and we must make sure that the moderate forces will not be erased."

The American effort was part of a broader international package proposed to the Quartet to strengthen Mahmoud Abbas's Palestinian security forces as Hamas threatens to increase its parallel Executive Force to 6,000 men. Training for Fatah Presidential Guard was provided by Egypt, Jordan and Turkey. Additional non-lethal equipment and fund for the purchase of arms were provided. Israel, too, allowed light arms to flow to members of the Presidential Guard, through Jordan and Egypt.

Israel's Security Agency supported President Abbas and the Presidential Guard, but was concerned about the weakness of Fatah. There was a plan to add the PLO's Jordan-based Badr Brigade to the Presidential Guard. As of October 2006, "while clashes between Hamas and elements of Fatah had been fierce", Israel Security Agency Director Yuval Diskin did not believe the Palestinians were on the verge of a civil war because neither side wanted one, but "should something happen to Haniyeh on the Hamas side, or Mohammed Dahlan or Rashid Abu Shabak on the Fatah side, anything could happen."

According to the IISS, the June 2007 escalation was triggered by Hamas's conviction that the PA's Presidential Guard, loyal to Mahmoud Abbas, was being positioned to take control of Gaza. The US had helped build up the Presidential Guard to 3,500 men since August 2006.

Plan to replace government 
The Hamas-led government met with Israeli opposition and Quartet sanctions, and President Abbas and the Fatah-dominated PLO developed a plan to replace the Hamas government with one acceptable to Israel and the international community. According to the plan, unveiled in Al Jazeera's Palestine Papers, a national unity government or a government of technocrats would be formed by the end of November to prepare early presidential and legislative elections by mid-2007. If the establishment of a government meeting the Quartet's conditions failed, President Abbas would announce a state of emergency, dismiss the government and form an emergency government, or call early elections. The developers of the plan were aware that an emergency government could legally govern only for one month without a vote of confidence by the PLC. An "Action Plan Leading to Early Elections" envisioned a strong enlargement of Fatah's Presidential Guard, internal reform of Fatah, empowering of presidential institutions, resumption of aid by the international community through the President's Office, and end of withholding of taxes by Israel.

By October 2006, the US administration, Israel, many Arab governments, and much of Fatah—including most of Abbas's key advisors still held the view that if Hamas did not unambiguously accept the Quartet's conditions, it should and could be forced out of power through early elections, its dismissal and appointment of an emergency government or a popular referendum seeking Palestinian agreement to the Quartet's conditions. The plan had also been put forward by US President Bush in his meeting with Abbas on 20 September 2006.

The plan was largely carried out:
 In March 2007, a national unity government was established after the February 2007 Mecca Agreement.
 On 14 June 2007, Palestinian President Mahmoud Abbas announced the dissolution of the unity government and declared a state of emergency.
 On 17 June 2007, Abbas established an emergency government without the approval of the PLC.
 Abbas-loyal troops were strengthened with international help and support from Israel.

Elections, however, did not take place. Already in December 2006, Abbas announced a plan for early elections "not be held until mid-2007", provoking tensions and some clashes between Hamas and Fatah supporters. In July 2007, he again called for early elections. Other calls were in October 2009 and in February 2011.

Battle 
On June 10, 2007, the Fatah–Hamas conflict culminated in clashes, between the Fatah-allied forces on one side and the Hamas-allied forces on the other side. Major Fatah forces were the National Security Forces, particularly the "Presidential Guard". Main force of Hamas was the "Executive Force".

Hamas militants seized several Fatah members and threw one of them, Mohammed Sweirki, an officer in the elite Palestinian Presidential Guard, off the top of the tallest building in Gaza, a 15-story apartment building. In retaliation, Fatah militants attacked and killed the imam of the city's Great Mosque, Mohammed al-Rifati. They also opened fire on the home of Prime Minister Ismail Haniyeh. Just before midnight, a Hamas militant was thrown off a 12-story building.

On June 11, the residences of both Mahmoud Abbas, Fatah's leader and the Palestinian Authority president, and of then-Prime Minister Ismail Haniya, of Hamas, were targeted with gun and shell fire.

On June 12, Hamas began attacking posts held by their Fatah faction rivals. Hundreds of Hamas fighters had moved on the positions after giving their occupants two hours to leave. A major Fatah base in the northern town of Jabaliya fell to Hamas fighters, witnesses told AFP news agency. Heavy fighting also raged around the main Fatah headquarters in Gaza City, with Hamas militants attacking with rocket-propelled grenades and automatic weapons.

On June 13, Hamas seized the headquarters of the Fatah-controlled National Security Forces in northern Gaza. Gunmen fought for control of high-rise buildings serving as sniper positions and Hamas said it had bulldozed a Fatah outpost controlling Gaza's main north-south road. Also on that day, an explosion wrecked the Khan Younis headquarters of the Fatah-linked Preventive Security Service, killing five people.

On June 14, Hamas gunmen completed the takeover of the central building of the Palestinian Preventive Security Service's headquarters in the Gaza Strip. The Hamas members took over vehicles and weapons in the compound, which was considered the Palestinian Authority's main symbol in the Strip. The Preventive Security Service cooperated with Israel in the past, and has been armed by the United States. It has been identified with Fatah powerhouse Mohammed Dahlan, who has become a figure hated by the Islamists in Gaza. The gunmen who entered the compound held a prayer there and waved a flag on the building's rooftop. At least 10 people were killed. Hamas TV broadcast a display of weapons inside the building, as well as jeeps, mortar shells and bulletproof vests seized in the compound, which, according to Hamas, were smuggled to Fatah by Israel and the Americans in the past few months through the border with Egypt.

Hamas members held a prayer in the compound, which they referred to as the "heresy compound." Hamas also changed the name of the neighborhood where the building is located from "Tel al-Hawa" to "Tel al-Islam".

On the afternoon of June 14, the Associated Press reported an explosion that rocked Gaza City. According to Fatah officials, security forces withdrew from their post and blew it up in order to not let Hamas take it over. The security forces afterwards repositioned to another location. Later on June 14, Hamas also took control of the southern Gaza Strip city Rafah which lies near an already closed border crossing with Egypt, which is monitored by Israeli, Palestinian and European Union security forces. The EU staff had, at that time, already been relocated to the Israeli city of Ashkelon for safety reasons. On June 14, Abbas dissolved the Palestinian-Hamas unity government, on 15 June, Hamas completed the control over Gaza.

Alleged military coup 
As a result of the battle, Hamas got complete control of Gaza. The pro-Fatah view is, that it was a plain military coup by Hamas. The pro-Hamas view is, that the US drew up a plan to arm Fatah cadres with the aim of forcefully removing Hamas from power in Gaza. According to the pro-Hamas view, Fatah fighters, led by commander Mohammed Dahlan with logistical support from the US Central Intelligence Agency, were planning to carry out a bloody coup against Hamas. Then, Hamas pre-emptively took control over Gaza.

In an April 2008 article in Vanity Fair magazine, the journalist David Rose published confidential documents, apparently originating from the US State Department, which would prove that the United States collaborated with the Palestinian Authority and Israel to attempt the violent overthrow of Hamas in the Gaza Strip, and that Hamas pre-empted the coup. The documents suggest that a government with Hamas should meet the demands of the Middle East Quartet, otherwise President Mahmoud Abbas should declare a state of emergency, which effectively would dissolve the current unity government, or the government should collapse by other means. Rose quotes former Vice President Dick Cheney's chief Middle East adviser David Wurmser, accusing the Bush administration of "engaging in a dirty war in an effort to provide a corrupt dictatorship [led by Abbas] with victory." He believes that Hamas had no intention of taking Gaza until Fatah forced its hand. "It looks to me that what happened wasn't so much a coup by Hamas but an attempted coup by Fatah that was pre-empted before it could happen"

According to Alastair Crooke, the then British Prime Minister Tony Blair decided in 2003 to tie UK and EU security policy in the West Bank and Gaza to a US-led counter-insurgency against Hamas. This led to an internal policy contradiction that pre-empted the EU from mounting any effective foreign policy on the "peace process" alternative to that of the US. At a political level, the EU "talked the talk" of reconciliation between Fatah and Hamas, Palestinian state-building and democracy. At the practical level, the EU "walked the walk" of disruption, detention, seizing finances, and destroying the capabilities of one [Hamas] of the two factions and prevented the parliament from exercising any function.

According to Crooke, the Quartet conditions for engagement with Hamas, which the EU had endorsed after the 2006 elections, were conditions raised precisely in order to prevent Hamas from meeting them, rather than as guidelines intended to open the path for diplomatic solutions. Then, British and American intelligence services were preparing a "soft" coup to remove Hamas from power in Gaza.

Violations of international law 

Human Rights Watch accused both sides of violating international humanitarian law, in some instances amounting to war crimes. The accusations include targeting and killing civilians, public executions of political opponents and captives, throwing prisoners off high-rise apartment buildings, fighting in hospitals, and shooting from a jeep marked with "TV" insignia. The International Committee of the Red Cross denounced attacks in and around two hospitals in the northern part of the Gaza strip.

During the fighting several incidents of looting took place: a crowd took furniture, wall tiles and personal belongings from the villa of the by now deceased Palestinian leader Yasser Arafat; the home of former Fatah commander Mohammed Dahlan was also looted: "An AFP correspondent witnessed dozens of Palestinians taking everything they could carry from Dahlan's villa—furniture, pot plants and even the kitchen sink, complete with plumbing fixtures such as taps"; and at the Muntada, Abbas's seafront presidential compound, witnesses reported seeing Hamas fighters remove computers, documents and guns.

Aftermath

Division of government 

On June 14, 2007, Palestinian President Mahmoud Abbas, reacted to the Hamas takeover by declaring a state of emergency. He dismissed the unity government led by Ismail Haniyeh, and by presidential decree installed Salam Fayyad as Prime Minister. Haniyeh refused to accept his dismissal, accusing Abbas of participating in a US-led plot to overthrow him. Experts in Palestinian law and independent members of the PLC have questioned the legitimacy of the Fayyad government. According to the Palestinian Basic Law, the President can dismiss the prime minister but the dismissed government continues to function as a caretaker government until a new government is formed and receives a vote of confidence from an absolute majority of the Palestinian Legislative Council. The Hamas-majority PLC has never met to confirm the Fayyad government. President Abbas by presidential decree in September 2007 changed the voting system for the PLC into a full proportional representation system, bypassing the dysfunctional PLC.

With the dissolution of the Hamas-led unity government, the territory controlled by the Palestinian Authority was de facto divided into two entities: the Hamas-controlled government of the Gaza Strip, and the West Bank, governed by the Palestinian National Authority.

The international community recognized the emergency government. Within days, the US recognized the Fayyad government and ended the 15-month economic and political boycott of the Palestinian Authority in a bid to bolster President Abbas and the new Fatah-led Fayyad government. The European Union similarly announced plans to resume direct aid to the Palestinians, while Israel released to Abbas Palestinian tax revenues that Israel had withheld since Hamas took control of the Palestinian Legislative Council. The Middle East Quartet reiterated their continued support to Abbas and resumed normal relations with the Fatah-led PA. UN Secretary General Ban Ki-moon urged international support for Abbas's efforts "to restore law and order". Israel and Egypt began a blockade of the Gaza Strip.

Possible religious consequences 
A Hamas spokesman in Gaza, Fouzi Barhoum, said earlier that Hamas was imposing Islamic law in Gaza but this was denied by exiled Hamas leader Khaled Mashal.

Sheik Abu Saqer, leader of Jihadia Salafiya, an Islamic outreach movement that recently announced the opening of a "military wing" to enforce Muslim law in Gaza. "I expect our Christian neighbors to understand the new Hamas rule means real changes. They must be ready for Islamic rule if they want to live in peace in Gaza." The sole Christian bookstore in Gaza was attacked and the owner murdered.

Weapons 
Hamas has captured thousands of small arms and eight armored combat vehicles supplied by the United States, Egypt, and Jordan to the Palestinian Authority.

According to Muhammad Abdel-El of the Hamas-allied Popular Resistance Committees, Hamas and its allies have captured quantities of foreign intelligence, including CIA files. Abu Abdullah of Hamas's "military wing", the Izz ad-Din al-Qassam Brigades, claims Hamas will make portions of the documents public, in a stated attempt to expose covert relations between the United States and "traitor" Arab countries.

While Hamas collected most of the 15,000 weapons registered to the former security forces, it failed to collect more than a fraction of the 400,000 weapons that are in the hands of various clans, and said that it would not touch weapons used for fighting Israel, only those that might be used against Hamas.

Notes

External links 
June 7, 2007, Fatah official killed, truce broken
In pictures: Hamas takes Gaza (BBC)

Gaza
Gaza
Fatah–Hamas conflict
Politics of the Gaza Strip
2007 in the Gaza Strip
June 2007 events in Asia
Gaza